Préneron is a commune in the Gers department in southwestern France.

Geography

Localisation

Hydrography 
The Auzoue flows north through the western part of the commune.

Population

See also
Communes of the Gers department

References

Communes of Gers